Club Baloncesto Zaragoza is a basketball team based in Zaragoza, Aragón, who played from 1981 to 1996 in the top Spanish league (Liga ACB since 1983) and now plays in the 1ª División, the fifth tier.  Most of the years in which the team played in Liga ACB, CB Zaragoza was also known as CAI Zaragoza for sponsorship reasons.

CB Zaragoza must be not confused with Basket Zaragoza 2002, the team of the same city who plays today in Liga ACB.

History 
The club was founded in 1981 with the purpose of having an elite team in the city of Zaragoza with sufficient resources to play in the 1ª División.

In 1984, CAI Zaragoza achieved its first title: the Copa del Rey, after beating FC Barcelona 81–78 in Zaragoza. The second Copa del Rey arrived in 1990, when CAI Zaragoza beat Ram Joventut 76–69 in the Centro Insular de Deportes at Las Palmas.

In 1990–91 season, the club participated in the FIBA European Cup Winners' Cup and managed to reach the final in Geneva where CAI lost to PAOK by 76–72. From 1992 to 1994, the club was sponsored by Banco NatWest España. Later, in 1996, due to financial problems, CB Zaragoza sold their Liga ACB berth and the FIBA Korać Cup spot to CB Granada and the senior team was folded.

In 2001 the senior team returned to Liga EBA but only played two years. Since 2004, CB Zaragoza started to play regional competitions. It was promoted several times to Liga EBA, but always remained in the Primera División.

Sponsorship naming 
 Zaragoza Skol: 1981–1982
 CAI Zaragoza: 1982–1992
 NatWest Zaragoza: 1992–1994
 Amway Zaragoza: 1994–1996
 Adecco Zaragoza: 2001–2003
 Serviplem Baryval Zaragoza: 2004–2008
 100x100 Basket Zaragoza: 2009–2013
 Universidad de Zaragoza CBZ: 2013–2015
 UniZar Azulejos Moncayo CBZ: 2015–present

Season by season

Trophies and awards

Trophies
Spanish Cups: (2)
1984, 1990
Saporta Cup Runners-up:
 1991

Individual awards 
Spanish Cup MVP
 Mark Davis – 1990

References 
 History of CB Zaragoza

External links 
 CB Zaragoza official site

Basketball teams in Aragon
Sport in Zaragoza
Basketball teams established in 1981
Former Liga ACB teams
Former Liga EBA teams
1981 establishments in Spain